Mayna may refer to:
Mayna (inhabited locality), several inhabited localities in Russia
Mayna (Rohtak), a village in Rohtak District of the State of Haryana in India
Mayna (plant), a genus of plants in the family Achariaceae
Mayna (tribe), one of several Jivaroan peoples in the upper Amazon
Myna (film), a 2013 Kannada film